Alfred Haynes can refer to:

Al Haynes (1931-2019), American airline pilot famous for his crash - landing of United Airlines Flight 232
Alf Haynes, English football player

See also
Alfred Haines (disambiguation)